Dillard is an unincorporated community and census-designated place in Douglas County, Oregon, United States. Dillard is south of the city of Winston. Dillard has a post office with ZIP code 97432. As of the 2010 census, it had a population of 478.

Demographics

Climate
This region experiences warm (but not hot) and dry summers, with no average monthly temperatures above 71.6 °F.  According to the Köppen Climate Classification system, Dillard has a warm-summer Mediterranean climate, abbreviated "Csb" on climate maps.

References

Unincorporated communities in Douglas County, Oregon
Census-designated places in Oregon
Census-designated places in Douglas County, Oregon
Unincorporated communities in Oregon